Ragweeds are flowering plants in the genus Ambrosia in the aster family, Asteraceae.

Ragweed may also refer to:

 Bassia scoparia, a shrub native to Eurasia
 Jacobaea vulgaris, also known as ragwort
 Cross Canadian Ragweed, an alternative country band

See also
 Ragwort (disambiguation)
 Ragweed leaf beetle, two beetles in the family Chrysomelidae